Communist Party of the Basque Country, is the federation of the Communist Party of Spain (PCE) in Basque Country and Navarre.

PCE-EPK publishes Hemen eta Orain. The general secretary of PCE-EPK is Jon Hernández. The youth organization of PCE-EPK is Gazte Komunistak (Communist Youth in Basque).

See also
Euskadi Roja
Communist Party of the Basque Homelands

External links
 

1935 establishments in Spain
Communist parties in the Basque Country (autonomous community)
Basque Country
Political parties established in 1935